Kevin Kesar (born July 19, 1985) is an American professional wrestler currently signed to WWE, where he performs on the SmackDown brand under the ring name Karrion Kross alongside his real life wife Scarlett Bordeaux.

Prior to his time at WWE, Kesar performed for Impact Wrestling, Lucha Libre AAA Worldwide (AAA), Major League Wrestling (MLW), and multiple promotions on the independent circuit under the ring names Kevin Kross and Killer Kross. In AAA, he was a member of the MAD and La Facción Ingobernable stables. He has also appeared on season four of AAA's American project Lucha Underground as The White Rabbit, the leader of Paul London's Rabbit Tribe stable.

Kesar signed with WWE in February 2020 under the ring name Karrion Kross and began a winning streak on their developmental brand, NXT, that led him to winning the NXT Championship before having to relinquish it due to injury. Kross regained the title in April 2021 at NXT TakeOver: Stand & Deliver. After making his main roster debut on the Raw brand that July, his winning streak was immediately broken, he lost the NXT Championship to Samoa Joe the following month, and his on-screen character was subsequently altered. WWE ultimately released Kesar in November, and he returned to WWE in August 2022 nine months after his initial release.

Professional wrestling career

Global Force Wrestling (2015) 
On July 24, 2015, Kesar made his Global Force Wrestling debut at the GFW Amped taping as Killer Kross, losing to Bobby Roode in the quarterfinal round of the GFW Global Championship tournament. On August 21, Kross faced Joey Ryan in a losing effort during the GFW Amped taping. On October 23, Kross faced Brian Myers and Kongo Kong in a three-way number one contenders match for the GFW Global Championship, which was won by Kong.

Lucha Underground (2015–2018) 
Between 2015 and 2016, Kevin Kross worked multiple dark matches for Lucha Underground. On December 13, 2015, Kross made his debut for the promotion, defeating Vinny Massaro in a dark match.

On July 11, 2018, Kross returned with a new character called The White Rabbit, he gave his wooden scepter to Paul London and ordered him to murder Mascarita Sagrada in cold blood for leading the Rabbit Tribe to his secret lair.

Lucha Libre AAA Worldwide (2017–2020) 
On March 19, 2017, as Kevin Kross, he made his AAA debut at Rey de Reyes, helping Johnny Mundo to win the AAA Mega Championship, AAA Latin American Championship and AAA World Cruiserweight Championship. He made his in-ring debut on April 12, teaming with Johnny Mundo and Taya to defeat Argenis, Ayako Hamada and El Hijo del Fantasma in a No Disqualification six-man tag team match. On June 4, Kross competed in a steel cage triple threat against El Hijo del Fantasma and El Texano Jr. at Verano de Escándalo, the match ended in a no contest after both Fantasma and Texano Jr. escaped the cage at the same time. On April 20, 2018, Kross return to AAA, aligning with Juventud Guerrera and Teddy Hart to attack Dr. Wagner Jr. and Hernandez. The trio called themselves MAD.

On August 3, 2019 at Triplemanía XXVII, Kross teamed with Los Mercenarios (Texano Jr. and Taurus) to face Psycho Clown, Cody Rhodes, and the debuting Cain Velasquez, Kross' team was defeated. On December 14 at Guerra de Titanes, Kross joined Rush's new La Facción Ingobernable stable.

Impact Wrestling (2018–2019) 
On the June 14, 2018 episode of Impact, Kesar, as Killer Kross, made his debut in a backstage segment posing as a police officer, arresting Petey Williams for being the suspected mystery X attacker who had been laying out talent and personnel backstage for several weeks. Once in a secluded area backstage, however, Kross attacked and choked a handcuffed Williams, revealing himself as the actual attacker. Kross made his in-ring debut on the July 5 episode of Impact, defeating Fallah Bahh. Two weeks later, Kross defeated Williams via referee stoppage after applying a choke hold.

On the August 9 episode of Impact, Kross helped Austin Aries retain his Impact World Championship against Eddie Edwards, hitting the latter with a Saito Suplex following a ref bump. Aries announced Kross as his "insurance policy" the following week. The duo were joined by Moose, who betrayed Edwards during a tag team match on August 30. At Bound for Glory on October 14, Kross and Moose were defeated by Edwards and Tommy Dreamer in an impromptu tag match. In the main event, Kross and Moose were in the corner of Aries as he lost the Impact World Championship to Johnny Impact.

After his alliance with Aries ended, Kross entered a storyline with Impact, in which Kross told Impact that he needed him to keep up Impact's title run much longer. At the Homecoming on January 6, 2019, Kross attacked both Impact and his wife Taya Valkyrie after the main event. On the January 25 episode of Impact!, Kross challenged Impact for the World Championship, however, the match ended in a double disqualification. At Impact Wrestling: Uncaged, Kross lost a fatal four-way for the title that also featured Moose and Brian Cage. Kross then entered into a feud with Eddie Edwards in May after Kross destroyed a kendo stick that was gifted to Edwards by Tommy Dreamer. This resulted in them wrestling in hardcore matches such as a street fight and first blood match. 

On May 13, it was reported that Kross asked for his release from Impact Wrestling following contract renegotiations. His issue stemmed from problems with his creative direction, as well as his current pay per appearance deal. He was not released at the time. At Slammiversary XVII on July 7, Kross lost a first blood match to Eddie Edwards, where he reportedly refused to do a blade job and they used fake blood instead. Reports indicated there was concern over "lack of blood testing and the absence of an on-site doctor." Following that match he was not booked to appear at the July, August or September television tapings and the two sides continued to negotiate. It was reported that his contract was set to expire in December but that the company had the option to roll it over for another year. In December, Impact Wrestling released Kross from his contract.

Major League Wrestling (2020) 
Kross made his debut for Major League Wrestling (MLW) at the Fightland event on February 1, 2020, where he defeated Tom Lawlor.

WWE (2020–2021) 
Before signing with WWE, Kesar made a one-off appearance on the February 16, 2015, episode of Raw as Kevin Kross, where he teamed with Darren Young to face The Ascension (Konnor and Viktor) in a match that resulted in a no contest.

On the February 4, 2020 episode of WWE Backstage, it was confirmed that Kross had signed with WWE. In the following weeks, mysterious video packages were shown that were later to be revealed as Kross'. On the April 8 episode of NXT, Kross and Scarlett (shortened from her former ring name Scarlett Bordeaux) were seen in a car watching Johnny Gargano following his match with Tommaso Ciampa. The following week, Kross debuted by attacking Ciampa. On the May 6 episode of NXT, under the new ring name Karrion Kross, he made his debut by defeating Leon Ruff in a squash match. At TakeOver: In Your House on June 7, Kross defeated Ciampa via technical submission. At TakeOver: XXX on August 22, he defeated Keith Lee to win the NXT Championship for the first time. However, the following day, WWE announced that Kross had suffered a separated shoulder during the match, and on the August 26 episode of NXT, he vacated the title; this ended his reign at only 4 days, making it the shortest in the title's history.

On the December 9 episode of NXT, Kross returned and attacked Damian Priest. At New Year's Evil on January 6, Kross defeated Priest. At the second night of TakeOver: Stand & Deliver on April 8, he defeated Finn Balor to win the NXT Championship for the second time. On the May 25 episode of NXT, Kross retained the title against Balor in his first title defense. On June 13 at In Your House, Kross successfully retained the championship by defeating Pete Dunne, Kyle O'Reilly, Johnny Gargano, and Adam Cole in a fatal 5-way match. On the July 13 episode of NXT, Gargano faced Kross for the NXT Championship with Samoa Joe as guest referee where he successfully retained. At TakeOver 36, Kross lost the NXT Championship to Joe, suffering his first loss in NXT; this was his final match in NXT before he was moved to Raw. 

While he was NXT Champion, Kross made his main roster debut on the July 19 episode of Raw, where he was defeated by Jeff Hardy in a non-title match, marking his first pinfall loss in WWE. Many critics and audiences complained that the result damaged the formidable character of Kross due to losing in less than two minutes. According to Kross in an interview after his release, the match originally was supposed to last 10-minutes before being abruptly shortened to 90 seconds just after he made his entrance to the ring. After losing the NXT Championship, Kross was transferred to Raw on its August 23 episode, performing without Scarlett and debuting a new look where he wore a gladiator helmet and suspenders in his entrance; his new attire and character direction was further criticized, with many deeming these changes unnecessary and poorly thought out. WWE Hall of Famer Mick Foley talked about WWE's problems, saying that Kross' character was "greatly watered down and even made a joke of when they debut on the main roster." Foley's comments were supported by another WWE Hall of Famer, Booker T. On November 4, Kross and Scarlett were released from their WWE contracts.

Return to MLW (2022)
In February 2022, Kross made his return to MLW, where he was absent for 2 years. Going by the Killer Kross name, he won his return debut match at SuperFight against Budd Heavy by referee stoppage. On July 31, at Ric Flair's Last Match event, Kross defeated Davey Boy Smith Jr..

New Japan Pro Wrestling (2022) 
Killer Kross made his NJPW debut at the Lonestar Shootout event, losing to Minoru Suzuki. Kross returned during the Collision 2022 tapings, defeating Yuya Uemura.

Return to WWE (2022–present) 
On the August 5, 2022 episode of SmackDown, Kesar, reprising his Karrion Kross character, made his unannounced return to WWE alongside Scarlett, attacking Drew McIntyre at the end of the show and officially joining the SmackDown brand in the process. On the September 23 episode of SmackDown, McIntyre challenged Kross to a strap match at Extreme Rules, which he accepted. At the event on October 8, Kross defeated McIntyre with the Kross Hammer after interference by Scarlett. On the SmackDown following Extreme Rules, Kross was scheduled to compete in a fatal four-way to determine the number one contender for the Intercontinental Championship; however, as the show went on the air, it was shown that Kross was involved in a car accident and as he was receiving help, he was attacked by McIntyre, rendering him unable to compete. Kross was replaced by Rey Mysterio, who went on to win the ensuing four-way. At Crown Jewel on November 5, Kross lost to McIntyre in a steel cage match when McIntyre escaped the cage before he did ending their feud. Beginning in December 2022, Kross began a feud with Rey Mysterio. On the January 27 episode of SmackDown, Kross lost to Rey after a roll up pin. The next night at Royal Rumble, Kross entered his first Royal Rumble match at #7 but was eliminated by McIntyre. On the February 24 episode of SmackDown, Kross defeated Rey after interference from Dominik Mysterio. On the March 3rd, 2023 episode of Smackdown, Kross appeared when Sheamus, Drew McIntyre, and other wrestlers were in the ring. Later he attacked the former and was announced to be participating in a Fatal Five Way Match with former rival Drew McIntyre, Sheamus, LA Knight, and Kofi Kingston to qualify for a match with Gunther for the intercontinental championship at Wrestlemania 39. The following week on SmackDown, Kross failed to win the match.

Other media
Kesar appears in WWE 2K22 and WWE 2K23 under his Karrion Kross persona.

Personal life
Kesar is in a relationship with fellow professional wrestler Elizabeth Chihaia, better known by her ring name Scarlett Bordeaux. On September 23, 2021, he announced his engagement to Bordeaux. On April 20, 2022, they announced their marriage in Alaska, in a private ceremony on a glacier.
Kesar is of Central American, as well as Puerto Rican descent.

Championships and accomplishments
Cauliflower Alley Club
Rising Star Award (2018)
Future Stars of Wrestling
 FSW Heavyweight Championship (1 time)
 FSW Mecca Championship (1 time)
Impact Wrestling
Impact Year End Awards for One to Watch in 2019 (2018)
Maverick Pro Wrestling
MPW Championship (2 times)
Modern Vintage Wrestling
MVW Heavyweight Championship (1 time)
Masters of Ring Entertainment
MORE Wrestling World Championship (1 time)
Pro Wrestling Illustrated
 Ranked No. 16 of the top 500 singles wrestlers in the PWI 500 in 2021
Ring Warriors
Ring Warriors Grand Championship (1 time)
Stand Alone Wrestling
PWAD Championship (1 time)
The Wrestling Revolver
REVOLVER Championship (1 time)
WWE
NXT Championship (2 times)

References

External links 

 
 
 
 

1985 births
American male professional wrestlers
American people of Puerto Rican descent
Living people
NXT Champions
Professional wrestlers from Nevada
Sportspeople from Las Vegas
American Muay Thai practitioners
American sportspeople of Puerto Rican descent
21st-century professional wrestlers
Professional wrestlers from New York City